The American Society for Enology and Viticulture, founded in 1950, is a non-profit, scientific wine production industry organization headquartered in Davis, California.  

Its membership of 2,400 includes professionals from wineries, vineyards, academic institutions and organizations. In addition, it has 120 Industrial Affiliates (companies).

Purpose
It is dedicated to promoting the interests of enologists, viticulturists, and others in the fields of wine and grape research and production throughout the world. 

The society publishes the American Journal of Enology and Viticulture.

See also

California wine

United States wine

References

External links
American Society for Enology and Viticulture

California wine organizations
Wine industry organizations
Food technology organizations
Organizations based in California
Organizations established in 1950
1950 establishments in California
Davis, California